Idiophantis acanthopa is a moth of the family Gelechiidae. It was described by Edward Meyrick in 1931. It is found in India.

The larvae feed on Eugenia jambolana.

References

Moths described in 1931
Idiophantis
Taxa named by Edward Meyrick